Heartlands Cornwall, often known simply as Heartlands, is a World Heritage Site Gateway and visitor attraction in Pool, Cornwall, England, UK. It has been dubbed as Cornwall's first free cultural playground. It was developed at South Crofty's Robinson Shaft and spread over 19 acres in the former mining heart of Cornwall.

The project was funded by the National Lottery and was opened on 20 April 2012 after 14 years of planning.

In 2014 the project came close to closure and was forced to reorganise its business plan and reduce its paid staff as a consequence of low visitor numbers and income.

Parkrun 
A parkrun takes place at Heartlands every Saturday.

References

External links
 Heartlands - official site

Parks and open spaces in Cornwall
Mining museums in Cornwall
Industrial archaeological sites in Cornwall